Thomas Woddow (born 3 June 1969) is a German rower. He competed in the men's coxed pair event at the 1992 Summer Olympics.

References

External links
 

1969 births
Living people
German male rowers
Olympic rowers of Germany
Rowers at the 1992 Summer Olympics
Sportspeople from Schwedt
20th-century German people